The Gatha Falls (or Gatha Seha) is a waterfall in Panna district in the Indian state of Madhya Pradesh. It is the 36th highest waterfall in India.

The falls

Location
The Gatha Falls is located near Panna, off the NH 39.

See also
List of waterfalls in India
List of waterfalls in India by height

References

Waterfalls of Madhya Pradesh
Tourist attractions in Panna district